Euagridae is a family of mygalomorph spiders. The group was first described as a tribe in 1979 by Robert Raven, who in 1985 elevated it to a subfamily. In 2020, Optova et al. elevated it further to a family.

Genera
, the World Spider Catalog accepted the following genera:

Allothele Tucker, 1920
Australothele Raven, 1984
Caledothele Raven, 1991
Carrai Raven, 1984
Cethegus Thorell, 1881
Chilehexops Coyle, 1986
Euagrus Ausserer, 1875
Leptothele Raven & Schwendinger, 1995
Malayathele Schwendinger, 2020
Namirea Raven, 1984
Phyxioschema Simon, 1889
Stenygrocercus Simon, 1892
Vilchura Ríos-Tamayo & Goloboff, 2017

References

 
Mygalomorphae families